PDXLAN is the largest computer LAN Party event in the American Northwest. The main event occurs twice per year, at the Clark County Event Center in Ridgefield, Washington.

Event summary
The twice annual events run 4 days, typically across a weekend. Attendees' ages range greatly from young children to, in some cases, senior citizens.

History
Listed here are past PDXLAN events.

References

Further reading
http://www.pcr-online.biz/news/read/nvidia-previews-unreleased-gpu-technology
http://www.hometoys.com/news_detail.php?section=view&id=14787759
http://www.tgdaily.com/games/36082-bandwidth-and-brawndo-power-pdxlan-party
http://www.bit-tech.net/news/modding/2005/08/17/pdxlan_5_case_mods/1
http://www.businesswire.com/news/home/20060206005460/en/F5-Gamers-Online-PDXLAN-Gaming-Conference-F5s
http://www.tgdaily.com/games-and-entertainment-features/36205-%E2%80%9Ca-lan-party-by-gamers-for-gamers%E2%80%9D-%E2%80%93-pdxlan-11
http://www.hometoys.com/news_detail.php?id=12467686

LAN parties